Rzochów  is a historic old town, now a suburb of Mielec , a city in the Subcarpathian Voivodeship (Województwo Podkarpackie) (since 1999). Mielec is a capital city of Mielec County.

History 

Rzochów was established between 1379 and 1382. At the beginning of the 15th century it was given city rights by king Władysław II Jagiełło. From about this time the town became known as a regional shoemaking centre. In the 19th century it was recorded that there were over 120 shoemakers, cordwainers and cobblers.
The rail link between Dębicą and Sandomierz was completed in 1887.

In 1985 Rzochów was incorporated into Mielec. Its population was at the time about 910 people

Notable people
 Jan Feliks Tarnowski
 Father Józef Smaczniak – 1895–1942

References

Bibliography

Notes

Mielec
Neighbourhoods in Poland
Lesser Poland
Kingdom of Galicia and Lodomeria
Kraków Voivodeship (1919–1939)